The Kid (1999) is a Hong Kong movie starring Leslie Cheung. It also co-stars Yip Tuen Nam, Ti Lung, and Carrie Ng.

Synopsis

This drama highlights the social problems of single parents struggling to raise children. Leslie Cheung plays the role of a retired fund-manager, Wing who lost his entire fortune in a financial mishap and was severely depressed until he discovered an abandoned baby boy in his yacht which he has not sold off at that time. He sought to raise the baby as his own son, encountering many happy moments even though he was not financially sound. His happiness is cruelly cut short a few years later as the now toddler's real mother returns and wishes to raise her own son again, while he attempts to prevent this as he loved his adopted son very much. The final touching scene depicts the inevitable as his beloved adopted son followed his mother into her luxury car while Wing fought back tears despite him voluntarily relenting into allowing the child to leave.

Cast and roles
 Leslie Cheung – Wing
 Carrie Ng		
 Ti Lung – Sir Lung
 Qi Qi – Maise
 Amanda Lee	
 Echo Shen

External links
 
 HK cinemagic entry

1999 drama films
1999 films
1990s Cantonese-language films
Hong Kong drama films
1990s Hong Kong films